The Chicago metropolitan area, also colloquially referred to as Chicagoland, is a metropolitan area in the Midwestern United States. Encompassing 10,286 sq mi (28,120 km2), the metropolitan area includes the city of Chicago, its suburbs and hinterland, spanning 14 counties in northeast Illinois, northwest Indiana, and southeast Wisconsin. The MSA had a 2020 census population of 9,618,502 and the combined statistical area which spans up to 19 counties had a population of nearly 10 million people. The Chicago area is the fifth largest metropolitan area in North America (after the metro areas of Mexico City, New York City, Los Angeles, and Washington), the fourth-largest metropolitan area in the United States, the largest within the entire Midwest, and the largest in the Great Lakes megalopolis. Its urban area is one of the forty largest in the world. 

According to the 2020 Census, the metropolitan's population is approaching the 10 million mark. The metropolitan area has seen a substantial increase of Latin American residents on top of its already large Latin population, and the Asian American population also increased according to the 2020 Census. The metro area also has a large number of White, Black, and Arab American residents, making the Chicago metropolitan area a truly diverse region. The Chicago metropolitan area represents about 3 percent of the entire United States population.

Chicagoland, as the metropolitan area is also called, has one of the world's largest and most diversified economies. With more than six million full and part-time employees, the Chicago metropolitan area is a key factor of the Illinois economy, as the state has an annual GDP of over $1 trillion. The Chicago metropolitan area generated an annual gross regional product (GRP) of approximately $700 billion in 2018. The region is home to more than 400 major corporate headquarters, including 31 in the Fortune 500 such as McDonald's, Boeing, United, and Blue Cross Blue Shield. With many companies moving to Chicagoland, and many current companies expanding, the area ranked as the nation's top metropolitan area for corporation relocations and expansions for nine consecutive years, the most consecutive years for any region in the country. 

The Chicago area is home to a number of the nation's leading research universities including the University of Chicago, Northwestern University, University of Illinois at Chicago, DePaul University, Loyola University, and the Illinois Institute of Technology. The University of Chicago and Northwestern University are consistently ranked as two of the best universities in the world.

There are many transportation options around the area. The region has three separate rail networks: the Chicago Transit Authority (CTA) operates elevated and subway lines that run primarily throughout the city, Downtown Chicago, and into some suburbs. The CTA operates some rail lines 24 hours a day, every day of the year, nonstop service, making Chicago and New York City the only two cities in the world to offer some 24 hour rail service running nonstop, everyday throughout their city limits. The city-suburban Metra rail network runs numerous lines between Downtown Chicago and suburban/satellite cities and the South Shore Line runs between Downtown Chicago and suburban Northwest Indiana. Amtrak operates a national rail hub at Union Station in Downtown Chicago.

CTA bus routes primarily serve the city proper, with some service into the suburbs. Several CTA bus routes also operate 24 hours a day, nonstop. Pace bus routes primarily serve the suburbs, with some service into the city.

Definitions

Chicago Metropolitan statistical area

The Chicago metropolitan statistical area (MSA) was originally designated by the United States Census Bureau in 1950. It comprised the Illinois counties of Cook, DuPage, Kane, Lake and Will, along with Lake County in Indiana. As surrounding counties saw an increase in their population densities and the number of their residents employed within Cook County, they met Census criteria to be added to the MSA. The Chicago MSA, now defined by the U.S. Office of Management and Budget (OMB) as the Chicago–Naperville–Elgin, IL–IN–WI Metropolitan Statistical Area, is the third largest MSA by population in the United States. The 2021 census estimate for the population of the MSA was 9,509,934.

The Chicago MSA is further subdivided into four metropolitan divisions. A breakdown of the county constituents and 2021 estimated populations of the four metropolitan divisions of the MSA are as follows:

Chicago–Naperville–Elgin, IL–IN–WI Metropolitan Statistical Area (9,509,934)
 Chicago–Naperville–Evanston, IL Metropolitan Division (7,159,394)
 Cook County, Illinois (5,173,146)
 DuPage County, Illinois (924,885)
 Grundy County, Illinois (52,989)
 McHenry County, Illinois (311,122)
 Will County, Illinois (697,252)
 Elgin, IL Metropolitan Division (750,869)
 DeKalb County, Illinois (100,414)
 Kane County, Illinois (515,588)
 Kendall County, Illinois  (134,867)
 Gary, IN Metropolitan Division (719,700)
 Jasper County, Indiana (33,091)
 Lake County, Indiana (498,558)
 Newton County, Indiana (13,808)
 Porter County, Indiana (174,243)
 Lake County–Kenosha County, IL–WI Metropolitan Division (879,971)
 Lake County, Illinois (711,239)
 Kenosha County, Wisconsin (168,732)

Combined Statistical Area
The OMB also defines a slightly larger region as a Combined Statistical Area (CSA). The Chicago–Naperville, IL–IN–WI Combined Statistical Area combines the following core-based statistical areas, listed with their 2021 estimated populations. The combined statistical area as a whole had a population of 9,876,339 as of 2021.

 Chicago–Naperville–Elgin, IL–IN–WI metropolitan statistical area (9,509,934)
 Kankakee, IL metropolitan statistical area (106,601)
 Kankakee County, Illinois (106,601)
 Michigan City–La Porte, IN metropolitan statistical area (112,390)
 LaPorte County, Indiana (112,390)
 Ottawa, IL micropolitan statistical area (147,414)
 Bureau County, Illinois (32,883)
 LaSalle County, Illinois (108,965)
 Putnam County, Illinois (5,566)

United Nations' Chicago urban agglomeration
The Chicago urban agglomeration, according to the United Nations World Urbanization Prospects report (2018 revision), lists a population of 8,864,000. The term "urban agglomeration" refers to the population contained within the contours of a contiguous territory inhabited at urban density levels.  It usually incorporates the population in a city, plus that in the contiguous urban, or built-up area.

Chicagoland

Chicagoland is an informal name for the Chicago metropolitan area. The term Chicagoland has no official definition, and the region is often considered to include areas beyond the corresponding MSA, as well as portions of the greater CSA.

Colonel Robert R. McCormick, editor and publisher of the Chicago Tribune, usually gets credit for placing the term in common use. McCormick's conception of Chicagoland stretched all the way to nearby parts of four states (Indiana, Wisconsin, Michigan, and Iowa). The first usage was in the Tribune'''s  July 27, 1926 front page headline, "Chicagoland's Shrines: A Tour of Discoveries", for an article by reporter James O'Donnell Bennett. He stated that Chicagoland comprised everything in a  radius in every direction and reported on many different places in the area. The Tribune was the dominant newspaper in a vast area stretching to the west of the city, and that hinterland was closely tied to the metropolis by rail lines and commercial links.

Today, the Chicago Tribunes usage includes the city of Chicago, the rest of Cook County, eight nearby Illinois counties (Lake, McHenry, DuPage, Kane, Kendall, Grundy, Will, and Kankakee), and the two Indiana counties of Lake and Porter. Illinois Department of Tourism literature uses Chicagoland for suburbs in Cook, Lake, DuPage, Kane, and Will counties, treating the city separately. The Chicagoland Chamber of Commerce defines it as all of Cook, DuPage, Kane, Lake, McHenry, and Will counties.

In addition, company marketing programs such as Construction Data Company's "Chicago and Vicinity" region and the Chicago Automobile Trade Association's "Chicagoland and Northwest Indiana" advertising campaign are directed at the MSA itself, as well as LaSalle, Winnebago (Rockford), Boone, and Ogle counties in Illinois, in addition to Jasper, Newton, and La Porte counties in Indiana and Kenosha, Racine, and Walworth counties in Wisconsin, and even as far northeast as Berrien County, Michigan. The region is part of the Great Lakes Megalopolis, containing an estimated 54 million people.

Collar counties
The term "collar counties" is a colloquialism for the five counties (DuPage, Kane, Lake, McHenry, and Will) of Illinois that border Chicago's Cook County. After Cook County, they are also the next five most populous counties in the state.  According to the Encyclopedia of Chicago, there is no specifically known origin of the phrase, but it has been commonly used among policy makers, urban planners, and in the media. However, it also notes that as growth has spread beyond these counties, it may have lost some of its usefulness.

Chicago Metropolitan Agency for Planning

Chicago Metropolitan Agency for Planning (CMAP) is an Illinois state agency responsible for transportation infrastructure, land use, and long-term economic development planning for the areas under its jurisdiction within Illinois. The planning area has a population of over 8 million, which includes the following locations in Illinois:

 Cook County
 DuPage County
 Kane County
 Kendall County
 Lake County
 McHenry County
 Will County

Geography and environment

The city of Chicago lies in the Chicago Plain, a flat and broad area characterized by little topographical relief. The few low hills are sand ridges. North of the Chicago Plain, steep bluffs and ravines run alongside Lake Michigan.

Along the southern shore of the Chicago Plain, sand dunes run alongside the lake. The tallest dunes reach up to near  and are found in Indiana Dunes National Park. Surrounding the low plain are bands of moraines in the south and west suburbs. These areas are higher and hillier than the Chicago Plain. A continental divide, separating the Mississippi River watershed from that of the Great Lakes and Saint Lawrence River, runs through the Chicago area.

A 2012 survey of the urban trees and forests in the seven county Illinois section of the Chicago area found that 21% of the land is covered by the tree and shrub canopy, made up of about 157,142,000 trees.  The five most common tree species are buckthorn, green ash, boxelder, black cherry, and American elm. These resources perform important functions in carbon storage, water recycling, and energy saving.

Demographics

As of the 2010 Census, the metropolitan area had a population of  9,729,825. The population density was 1,318 per square mile.
The racial makeup was 52.8% Non-Hispanic White, 22.1% were Hispanic, 16.7% were Non-Hispanic African Americans, and 6.4% were Asian. Other ethnic groups such as Native Americans and Pacific Islanders made up 2.0% of the population.

The suburbs, surrounded by easily annexed flat ground, have been expanding at a tremendous rate since the early 1960s. Aurora, Elgin, Joliet, and Naperville are noteworthy for being four of the few boomburbs outside the Sun Belt, West Coast and Mountain States regions, and exurban Kendall County ranked as the fastest-growing county (among counties with a population greater than 10,000) in the United States between the years 2000 and 2007.

Settlement patterns in the Chicago metropolitan area tend to follow those in the city proper: the northern suburbs along the shore of Lake Michigan are comparatively affluent, while the southern suburbs (sometimes known as Chicago Southland) are less so, with lower median incomes and a lower cost of living. However, there is a major exception to this. While Chicago's West Side is the poorest section of the city, the western and northwestern suburbs contain many affluent areas. According to the 2000 Census, DuPage County had the highest median household income of any county in the Midwestern United States.

According to the 2000 U.S. Census, poverty rates of the largest counties from least poverty to most are as follows: McHenry 3.70%, Dupage 5.9%, Will 6.7%, Lake 6.9%, Kane 7.4%, Cook 14.5%.

In an in-depth historical analysis, Keating (2004, 2005) examined the origins of 233 settlements that by 1900 had become suburbs or city neighborhoods of the Chicago metropolitan area. The settlements began as farm centers (41%), industrial towns (30%), residential railroad suburbs (15%), and recreational/institutional centers (13%). Although relations between the different settlement types were at times contentious, there also was cooperation in such undertakings as the construction of high schools.

Population
As the Chicago metropolitan area has grown, more counties have been partly or totally assimilated with the taking of each decennial census.

Counties highlighted in gray were not included in the MSA for that census.
The CSA totals in blue are the totals of all the counties listed above, regardless of whether they were included in the Chicago Combined Statistical Area at the time.

Principal municipalities

Over 1,000,000 population
 Chicago (2,746,388)

Over 100,000 population
 Aurora, Illinois (180,542)
 Joliet, Illinois (150,362)
 Naperville, Illinois (149,540)
 Elgin, Illinois (114,797)

Over 50,000 population

 Kenosha, Wisconsin (99,986)
 Waukegan, Illinois (89,321)
 Cicero, Illinois (85,268)
 Schaumburg, Illinois (78,723)
 Evanston, Illinois (78,110)
 Hammond, Indiana (77,879)
 Arlington Heights, Illinois (77,676)
 Bolingbrook, Illinois (73,922)
 Gary, Indiana (69,093)
 Palatine, Illinois (67,908)
 Skokie, Illinois (67,824)
 Des Plaines, Illinois (60,675)
 Orland Park, Illinois (58,703)
 Oak Lawn, Illinois (58,362)
 Berwyn, Illinois (57,250)
 Mount Prospect, Illinois (56,852)
 Tinley Park, Illinois (55,971)
 Oak Park, Illinois (54,583)
 Wheaton, Illinois (53,970)
 Downers Grove, Illinois (50,247)

Urban areas within
Within the boundary of the 16-county Chicago Combined Statistical Area lies the Chicago urban area, as well as 26 smaller urban areas. Some of the urban areas below may partially cross into other statistical areas. Only those situated primarily within the Chicago combined statistical area are listed here.

Economy

The Chicago metropolitan area is home to the corporate headquarters of 57 Fortune 1000 companies, including AbbVie Inc., Allstate, Boeing, Caterpillar Inc., Kraft Heinz, McDonald's, Mondelez International, Motorola, United Airlines, Walgreens, and more. The Chicago area also headquarters a wide variety of global financial institutions including Citadel LLC, Discover Financial Services, Morningstar, Inc., CNA Financial, and more. Chicago is home to the largest futures exchange in the world, the Chicago Mercantile Exchange. In March 2008, the Chicago Mercantile Exchange announced its acquisition of NYMEX Holdings Inc, the parent company of the New York Mercantile Exchange and Commodity Exchange. CME'S acquisition of NYMEX was completed in August 2008.

A key piece of infrastructure for several generations was the Union Stock Yards of Chicago, which from 1865 until 1971 penned and slaughtered millions of cattle and hogs into standardized cuts of beef and pork. This prompted poet Carl Sandburg to describe Chicago as the "Hog Butcher for the World".

The Chicago area, meanwhile, began to produce significant quantities of telecommunications gear, electronics, steel, crude oil derivatives, automobiles, and industrial capital goods.

By the early 2000s, Illinois' economy had moved toward a dependence on high-value-added services, such as financial trading, higher education, logistics, and health care.  In some cases, these services clustered around institutions that hearkened back to Illinois's earlier economies.  For example, the Chicago Mercantile Exchange, a trading exchange for global derivatives, had begun its life as an agricultural futures market.

In 2007, the area ranked first among U.S. metro areas in the number of new and expanded corporate facilities. It ranked third in 2008, behind the Houston–Sugar Land–Baytown and Dallas–Fort Worth metropolitan areas, and ranked second behind the New York metropolitan area in 2009.

The Wall Street Journal summarized the Chicago area's economy in November 2006 with the comment that "Chicago has survived by repeatedly reinventing itself."

Transportation

Major airports
 Chicago O'Hare International Airport (ORD)
 Chicago Midway International Airport (MDW)
 Milwaukee Mitchell International Airport (MKE) (located in the adjacent Milwaukee metropolitan area)
 Chicago Rockford International Airport (RFD) (located in the adjacent Rockford metropolitan area)
 Gary/Chicago International Airport (GYY)

Commercial ports
 Port of Chicago
 Port of Indiana-Burns Harbor

Transit systems

Commercial freight
Chicago has been at the center of the United States' railroad network since the 19th century.  Almost all Class I railroads serve the area, the most in North America.

Passenger
 Chicago Transit Authority trains, locally referred to as " the 'L' ", (after "elevated train") serving Chicago and the near suburbs
 Pace Suburban Bus operates suburban bus and regional vanpool, paratransit, and ride-matching services in the Chicagoland region.
 Metra run by the Northeast Illinois Regional Commuter Railroad Corporation:
 4 lines serving southern Cook County and Will County
 3 lines serving western Cook County, DuPage County, and Kane County
 2 lines serving northern Cook County and Lake County
 1 line serving northern Cook County, Lake County, and Kenosha County
 1 line serving northwestern Cook County and McHenry County
 South Shore Line shares the Metra electric lines and connects Chicago to Gary, Michigan City, and ending at South Bend.
 Amtrak operates Union Station which is the major Amtrak passenger rail hub with connections to Metra and the within a few blocks of connections to several 'L' lines. Amtrak also operates a connecting station out of Joliet.

Major highways

Interstates
 Interstate 41 (I-41) runs concurrently with Interstate 94 at the northern terminus of the Tri-State Tollway.
 Interstate 55 (I-55) is the Adlai Stevenson Expy.
 I-355 is the Veterans Memorial Tollway (formerly North-South Tollway).
 I-57 is unofficially the "West Leg" of the Dan Ryan Expy.
 I-65 has no name, whether official or unofficial.
 I-80 is officially called the Borman Expy (cosigned with I-94), Kingery Expy (cosigned with I-94 for 3 miles), Tri-State Tollway (cosigned with I-294 for 4 miles) and is unofficially called the Moline Expy west of I-294.
 I-88 is the Ronald Reagan Memorial Tollway (formerly East-West Tollway)
 I-90 is locally known as Jane Addams Tollway (formerly Northwest Tollway), John F Kennedy Expy (cosigned with I-94), Dan Ryan Expy (cosigned with I-94), and Chicago Skyway Toll Bridge. The Chicago Skyway is disputed since around 2000 if it actually is I-90. Currently it is signed as "To I-90" in both directions.
 I-190 is the John F. Kennedy Expy spur heading into Chicago-O'Hare Int'l Airport.
 I-290 is the Dwight D. Eisenhower Expy.
 I-94 is Tri-State Tollway in Lake County, Edens Spur, Edens Expy, John F. Kennedy Expy (cosigned with I-90), Dan Ryan Expy (cosigned with I-90), Bishop Ford Frwy (formerly Calumet Expy), Kingery Expy (cosigned with I-80) and Borman Expy (cosigned with I-80).
 I-294 is the Tri-State Tollway.

Other main highways
 US Routes in the Illinois part of the area include: US 6, US 12, US 14, US 20, US 30, US 34, US 41, US 45, and US 52.
 Illinois Route 53, an arterial north–south state highway running through Grundy, Will, DuPage, Cook and Lake counties
 Historic US Route 66's eastern terminus is in Chicago.

Major corridors
In addition to the Chicago Loop, the metro area is home to a few important subregional corridors of commercial activities.  Among them are:
 Illinois Technology and Research Corridor, along the Ronald Reagan Memorial Tollway (Interstate 88)
 Golden Corridor, along the Jane Addams Memorial Tollway (Interstate 90)
 Lakeshore Corridor, along the Edens Expressway and Tri-State Tollway

Culture

Sports

Listing of the professional sports teams in the Chicago metropolitan areaMajor league professional teams: Major League Baseball (MLB)
 Chicago Cubs
 Chicago White Sox
 National Football League (NFL)
 Chicago Bears
 National Basketball Association (NBA)
 Chicago Bulls
 National Hockey League (NHL)
 Chicago Blackhawks
 Major League Soccer (MLS)
 Chicago FireOther professional teams: Women's National Basketball Association (WNBA)
 Chicago Sky
 National Women's Soccer League (NWSL)
 Chicago Red Stars
 National Pro Fastpitch (NPF)
 Chicago Bandits
 American Association of Professional Baseball (AA)
 Chicago Dogs
 Kane County Cougars
 Gary SouthShore RailCats
 American Hockey League (AHL)
 Chicago Wolves
 NBA G League (NBAGL)
 Windy City Bulls
 Arena Football (AFL)
 Chicago Rush (Operations suspended in 2013, no longer part of the AFL)

The Chicagoland Speedway oval track has hosted NASCAR Cup Series and IndyCar Series races.
The Chicago Marathon is one of the World Marathon Majors.
The Western Open and BMW Championship are PGA Tour tournaments that have been held primarily at golf courses near Chicago.NCAA Division I College Sports Teams:' Big East Conference
 DePaul University Blue Demons
 Big Ten Conference
 Northwestern University Wildcats (Evanston)
 Horizon League
 University of Illinois-Chicago Flames
 Mid-American Conference
 Northern Illinois University Huskies (DeKalb)
 Missouri Valley Conference
 Loyola University-Chicago Ramblers
  Valparaiso University Beacons (Valparaiso, IN)
 Western Athletic Conference
 Chicago State University Cougars

Cuisine

 Chicago-style hot dog
 Chicago-style pizza
 Italian beef
 Caramel popcorn

Media

The two main newspapers are the Chicago Tribune and the Chicago Sun-Times. Local television channels broadcasting to the Chicago market include WBBM-TV 2 (CBS), WMAQ-TV 5 (NBC), WLS-TV 7 (ABC), WGN-TV 9 (Ind), WTTW 11 (PBS), MeTV 23, WCIU 26 (CW), WFLD 32 (FOX), WCPX-TV 38 (Ion), WSNS-TV 44 (Telemundo), WPWR-TV 50 (MyNetworkTV), and WJYS-TV 62 (The Way). Radio stations serving the area include: WBBM (AM), WBEZ, WGN (AM), WMBI, WLS (AM), and WSCR.

Education

Elementary and secondary education within the Chicago metropolitan area is provided by dozens of different school districts, of which by far the largest is the Chicago Public Schools with 400,000 students.  Numerous private and religious school systems are also found in the region, as well as a growing number of charter schools.  Racial inequalities in education in the region remain widespread, often breaking along district boundaries; for instance, educational prospects vary widely for students in the Chicago Public Schools compared to those in some neighboring suburban schools.

Historically, the Chicago metropolitan area has been at the center of a number of national educational movements, from the free-flowing Winnetka Plan to the regimented Taylorism of the Gary Plan.  In higher education, University of Chicago founder William Rainey Harper was a leading early advocate of the junior college movement; Joliet Junior College is the nation's oldest continuously-operating junior college today.  Later U of C president Robert Maynard Hutchins was central to the Great Books movement, and programs of dialogic education arising from that legacy can be found today at the U of C, at Shimer College, and in the City Colleges of Chicago and Oakton Community College in the Northwest suburbs.

Area codes

From 1947 until 1988, the Illinois portion of the Chicago metro area was served by a single area code, 312, which abutted the 815 area code.  In 1988 the 708 area code was introduced and the 312 area code became exclusive to the city of Chicago.

It became common to call suburbanites "708'ers", in reference to their area code.

The 708 area code was partitioned in 1996 into three area codes, serving different portions of the metro area: 630, 708, and 847.

At the same time that the 708 area code was running out of phone numbers, the 312 area code in Chicago was also exhausting its supply of available numbers. As a result, the city of Chicago was divided into two area codes, 312 and 773.  Rather than divide the city by a north–south area code, the central business district retained the 312 area code, while the remainder of the city took the new 773 code.

In 2002, the 847 area code was supplemented with the overlay area code 224.  In February 2007, the 815 area code (serving outlying portions of the metro area) was supplemented with the overlay area code 779.  In October 2007, the overlay area code 331 was implemented to supplement the 630 area with additional numbers.

Plans are in place for overlay codes in the 708, 773, and 312 regions as those area codes become exhausted in the future.
 312 Chicago - City (The Loop and central neighborhoods, e.g. the Near North Side)
 773 Chicago - City (Everywhere else within the city limits, excluding central area)
 872 Chicago - City (overlay for 312 & 773, effective November 7, 2009)
 847/224 (North and Northwest Suburbs)
 630/331 (Outer Western Suburbs)
 708 (South and Near West Suburbs)
 815/779 (Rockford & Joliet: Far Northwest/Southwest Suburbs)
 219 (Northwest Indiana)
 574 (North-central Indiana)
 262 (Southeast Wisconsin surrounding Milwaukee County)

Proposed overlays
 464 overlay for 708 (1/21/2022 rollout)

See also

References

Further reading
 Fischer, Paul B. (July 28, 1993). Racial and Locational Patterns of Subsidized Housing in the Chicago Suburbs: A Report to the MacArthur Foundation (Archive). Lake Forest, Ill.: Lake Forest College. Report to the MacArthur Foundation.
 Lewinnek, Elaine (2014). The Working Man's Reward: Chicago's Early Suburbs and the Roots of American Sprawl''. Oxford: Oxford University Press.

External links

 U.S. Census Urbanized Area Outline Map (2000)
 Chicago-Naperville-Michigan City, IL-IN-WI Combined Statistical Area (2012) map
 Illinois CBSAs and Counties (2013) map
 U.S. Census Bureau Chicago city, Illinois QuickFacts
 Metropolitan and Micropolitan Statistical Areas
 About Metropolitan and Micropolitan Statistical Areas
 History of Metropolitan Areas
 Metropolitan and Micropolitan Statistical Areas Population Totals and Components of Change: 2010-2019

 

Metropolitan areas of Illinois
Metropolitan areas of Indiana
Metropolitan areas of Wisconsin
Regions of Illinois
Regions of Indiana
Regions of Wisconsin
1837 establishments in the United States